Presles is a commune in the Val-d'Oise département in Île-de-France in northern France. Presles–Courcelles station has rail connections to Persan, Sarcelles and Paris.

Inhabitants are known as Preslois (male) or Presloises (female) in French.

See also
Communes of the Val-d'Oise department

References

External links

Official website 

Association of Mayors of the Val d'Oise 

Communes of Val-d'Oise